Fiachna or Fiachnae is a name borne by several figures from Irish history and legend, including:

Fiachnae mac Báetáin, king of the Dál nAraidi in the 7th century
Fiachnae mac Demmáin, king of the Dál Fiatach in the 7th century
Fiachan of Lismore, (died 630), early Irish monk who was venerated as a saint. 
Fiachnae mac Áedo Róin, (died 789), king of Ulaid 
Fiachna Ó Braonáin (born 1965), Irish rock musician (Hothouse Flowers)

Similar names
 Fiach
 Fiacha
 Fiachra

Irish-language masculine given names